Ugandax is an extinct genus of bovines in the subtribe Bubalina that lived from the Miocene to the Pleistocene of Africa.  Cladistic analyses suggest Ugandax represents an ancestral form of the African buffalo, Syncerus, and teeth assigned to Ugandax represent the earliest appearance of bovines in Africa.

References

Bovines
Prehistoric bovids
Miocene mammals of Africa
Pliocene mammals of Africa
Pleistocene mammals of Africa
Fossil taxa described in 1970
Prehistoric even-toed ungulate genera